Usher's Passing is a Gothic historical fiction novel by American writer Robert McCammon. It was published in 1984 by Holt, Rinehart, and Winston. It focuses on the divide between an aristocratic family (the Ushers) (much like the Vanderbilts) and a community of hill people near Asheville, North Carolina. Both are drawn into a plot surrounding a string of child disappearances, a mysterious serial killer, and ghouls and monsters that lie buried deep within the Ushers' family history, and the answers to which lie deep within the sprawling, creaky mansion they call home.

References

American historical novels
American gothic novels
Ghost novels
1984 American novels
Novels set in North Carolina
Asheville, North Carolina